Korenevka , rural localities in Russia, may refer to:

 Korenevka, Fatezhsky District, Kursk Oblast, a khutor
 Korenevka, Medvensky District, Kursk Oblast, a village
 Korenevka, Tula Oblast, a village